The Souther-Hillman-Furay Band is the debut album by the supergroup, The Souther-Hillman-Furay Band, released in 1974 on Asylum Records. It peaked at number 11 on the Billboard albums chart.

History
The Souther-Hillman-Furay Band was a country rock supergroup led by singer-songwriters Richie Furay, Chris Hillman, and J.D. Souther. The band was formed in 1973 upon the request of David Geffen, then head of Asylum Records. The group had a substantial hit with the 1974 self-titled first album and the single "Fallin' in Love" reached No. 27 in the U.S. It was reissued on CD by the Wounded Bird label in 2002.

Reception

In his review for Allmusic, critic Brett Hartenbach wrote "despite high expectations along with the history of their members, the Souther-Hillman-Furay Band's 1974 eponymous debut never quite lived up to its promise. The trio... delivers a collection of ten pleasant, if overall unremarkable tunes in the singer/songwriter, country-rock vein. There are glimmers of past glories by each, but only Furay really connects solidly... there should be enough here—thanks especially to the Furay tracks—that will at least be of moderate interest to most fans."

Track listing
"Fallin' in Love" (Richie Furay) – 3:31
"Heavenly Fire" (Len Fagan, Chris Hillman) – 3:46
"The Heartbreaker" (J. D. Souther) – 2:57
"Believe Me" (Furay) – 5:03
"Border Town" (Souther) – 3:54
"Safe at Home" (Hillman) – 2:54
"Pretty Goodbyes" (Souther) – 3:43
"Rise and Fall" (Fagan, Hillman) – 3:08
"The Flight of the Dove" (Furay) – 4:08
"Deep, Dark and Dreamless" (Souther) – 5:37

Personnel
J.D. Souther - vocals, guitar
Chris Hillman - vocals, bass, mandolin, guitar
Richie Furay - vocals, guitar
Jim Gordon - drums, percussion
Paul Harris - keyboards
Joe Lala - percussion on "Border Town" and "Rise and Fall"
Al Perkins - pedal steel guitar, guitar and bass on "Heavenly Fire"; dobro on "Rise and Fall"
Production notes
Richard Podolor - producer, mixing
Elliot Roberts - direction
Doug Sax - mastering
Bill Cooper - engineer, mixing
Jimmy Wachtel - design, artwork
Amanda Flick - assistant to artwork
Lorrie Sullivan - photography

Charts

References

J. D. Souther albums
1974 debut albums
Albums produced by Richard Podolor
Albums with cover art by Jimmy Wachtel
Asylum Records albums